Dylan Chiazor is a Dutch professional footballer who plays as a forward for Icelandic 1. deild karla side Leiknir Reykjavík.

Career
Born in Amersfoort, Chiazor started his youth career at VVZA Amersfoort, before joining VV Hooglanderveen. He then moved to the academy of Ajax before moving to PEC Zwolle in 2010 and he signed for IJsselmeervogels for 3 years in 2012. His next club was Almere City FC whom he played for between 2014 and 2016, before signing for IJsselmeervogels in 2016. In the summer of 2019, he signed for Eerste Divisie club De Graafschap on a one-year contract following a trial period at the club. He made his debut only appearance for De Graafschap on 29 October 2019 in a 2–0 KNVB Cup defeat to fellow Eerste Divisie club SBV Vitesse. He initially returned to IJsselmeervogels in the summer of 2020 following a one-year spell at De Graafschap, but instead chose to move to Icelandic club Leiknir Reykjavík in August 2020.

References

External links
 

Living people
Sportspeople from Amersfoort
Dutch footballers
Leiknir Reykjavík players
1. deild karla players
Dutch expatriate sportspeople in Iceland
Expatriate footballers in Iceland
De Graafschap players
IJsselmeervogels players
Eerste Divisie players
1998 births
Association football forwards
Almere City FC players
PEC Zwolle players
AFC Ajax players
Tweede Divisie players
Footballers from Utrecht (province)